 
The ARC Centre of Excellence for Australian Biodiversity and Heritage (CABAH) is a research centre which focuses on the natural, historic and Indigenous heritage of Australia. Its aim is to increase understanding of the past in order to be able to better adapt and plan for the future.

The facility was opened at Parliament House, Canberra on 22 June 2017, and planned to run for seven years.

An outreach program to schools and the broader community has been set up to engage participation and interest in science, and educational facilities to help train new researchers, with a particular focus on nurturing the careers of Indigenous and female researchers. As well as including scholars from STEM disciplines, including earth science, climate science, ecology and genetics, there  are researchers from the fields of humanities, arts and social sciences disciplines, such as archaeology, Indigenous studies and museology.

Organisation
, the Director of CABAH is geoscientist Professor Richard "Bert" Roberts, and the University of Wollongong is responsible for administration. Collaborators and partners are:

Australian National University
James Cook University in North Queensland
The University of New South Wales
University of Adelaide
Monash University
University of Tasmania
Queensland Museum
Australian Museum
Scarp Archaeology Pty Ltd
South Australian Museum
State Library of New South Wales
Bioplatforms Australia Ltd
Université Savoie-Mont Blanc (University of Savoy, France)
University of Papua New Guinea
Max Planck Institute for the Science of Human History
Natural History Museum of Denmark
Indonesian National Centre for Archaeology
University of Colorado, Boulder, US
Papua New Guinea National Museum and Art Gallery

Symposia
CABAH's 3rd Annual Symposium was held at Monash University from 4 to 8 November 2019.

References

Further reading

External links

Biodiversity
Research organisations in Australia
Heritage registers in Australia